Tommy Lee Jones was born on January 4, 1949,  and is an American retired professional wrestler, better known by his ring name, Tommy Lane. Lane is best known for his appearances in Southern United States professional wrestling promotions as Tommy Lane, one-half of the tag team the Rock 'n' Roll RPMs with Mike Davis.

Professional wrestling career

Early career
Jones started wrestling in the NWA's Central States promotion in 1981 under the name Tommy Rogers (not to be confused with the Tommy Rogers of the Fantastics tag team). In the summer of 1984, he and Marty Jannetty formed a duo called the Uptown Boys, and twice won the NWA Central States Tag Team Championship.

Jones also wrestled as Jeff Gouldie, the (kayfabe) son of Archie Gouldie, who also competed as the Mongolian Stomper. This storyline also allowed Jones to adopt the in-ring nickname Mongolian Stomper, Jr.

Rock 'n' Roll RPMs
Using the Tommy Lane moniker, Jones made his way to World Class Championship Wrestling, which at the time was still affiliated with the NWA. He started a tag team with Mike Davis called the Rock 'n' Roll RPMs. They had feuds with several tag teams, including another "Rock 'n' Roll" pairing known as The Rock 'n' Roll Express. The RPMs feuded with The Fantastics over the WCWA Tag Team Championship, as well, but were unable to win the title.

The RPMs then competed in the CWA in Memphis, where they won the AWA Southern Tag Team Championship twice, and feuded with The Midnight Rockers. Teaming with Cactus Jack, the Rock-n-Roll RPMs lost a six-man match against Hector, Chavo, and Mando Guerrero at the only AWA pay-per-view, SuperClash III.

After the demise of World Class, the RPMs moved on to World Championship Wrestling, where they were used as jobbers.

Tommy Lane later formed a tag team with "Big" Bobby Jones known as The NEW RPMs for Central All-Star Wrestling. the original RPMs were managed in the Memphis organization  by Downtown Bruno (Bruno  Lauer)

Championships and accomplishments
Central All-Star Championship Wrestling
CACW Heavyweight Championship (1 time)
Central States Wrestling
NWA Central States Tag Team Championship (2 times) – with Marty Jannetty
Continental Wrestling Association / Championship Wrestling Association
AWA Southern Tag Team Championship (5 times) – with Mike Davis
CWA Tag Team Championship (1 times) – with Mike Davis
Southeast Championship Wrestling
NWA Southeastern Tag Team Championship (1 time) – with Mongolian Stomper
USA Wrestling
USA Tag Team Championship (1 time) with Mike Davis
World Wrestling Council
WWC World Tag Team Championship (2 times) – with Mike Davis

References

External links 
 
 

American male professional wrestlers
Living people
People from Tennessee
Professional wrestlers from Tennessee
Stampede Wrestling alumni
20th-century professional wrestlers
1949 births
The Stud Stable members